Coromandel is a Brazilian municipality, located in the southeast region of the country, in the state of Minas Gerais. Its population is estimated at 27,966 people as of 2020. The municipality (município) of Coromandel is located 495 km from the state capital Belo Horizonte, and 673 km from São Paulo. Coromandel is one of the municipalities of the Triângulo Mineiro/Alto Paranaíba micro region and its territorial size is 3,296 km². Its borders are limited in the north by state of Goiás and Guarda-Mor municipality, east by the municipalities of Vazante, Lagamar, Patos de Minas and Guimarânia, west by the municipalities of Abadia dos Dourados and Monte Carmelo, and south by Patrocínio municipality. Coromandel has six districts: Alegre, Santa Rosa, Pântano de Santa Cruz, Lagamar dos Coqueiros and Mateiro.

Its economy is largely promoted by cerrado coffee agriculture (the legitimate Brazilian coffee for exportation) and plantations of soybean and corn. Also dairy farms supply several dairy products industries in the city. Cattle farms supply with its livestock meat to industries. Another important part of the economy is mining, for example the calcareous rocks exploration that is plenty used for agricultures to correct soil acidity. Diamond exploration has its importance as well, especially for local miners and companies. One of the most important diamonds in the world was discovered in Coromandel in 1938, named as Getúlio Vargas Diamond, it was a pure, rare and precious stone.

The origins of the name Coromandel is not decisively known among its population, but older generations believe the name is connected to the Coromandel Coast, in India, from where ships loaded with slaves would have departed.

References

External links

 official website

Municipalities in Minas Gerais